The Invitation is the second studio album released by Christian singer Meredith Andrews.

Track listing
All songs were written or co-written by Andrews; additional writers are listed below.

Awards

The album was nominated for a Dove Award for Praise & Worship Album of the Year at the 40th GMA Dove Awards.

References

2008 albums
Meredith Andrews albums